The Centro de Arte Moderna Gulbenkian (CAM) is a major venue for contemporary art in Portugal and holds one of the largest collections of modern and contemporary Portuguese artworks. Its building is currently under renovation and will reopen to the public, with a reformulated building, by Kengo Kuma, to celebrate its 40th anniversary in 2023. The CAM continues to develop its activities beyond the limits of the building until its reopening.

References 

Art museums and galleries in Portugal
Contemporary art galleries in Europe
Buildings and structures completed in 1983
1983 establishments in Portugal
Museums in Lisbon